Nero di Marte is an experimental metal band based in Bologna, Italy.
Formerly known under the name "Murder Therapy" since 2007, the band released their debut album Symmetry of Delirium in 2009 and the EP Molochian in 2011.
After some line-up changes, recording sessions for a new album took place throughout the summer of 2011, which was then mixed and mastered at Studio73 in Ravenna.
During the course of 2012, the band changed their name to Nero di Marte, the name the album was originally given and subsequently signed to Prosthetic Records, who released the album worldwide in mid-March 2013.
After their first North American tour with Gorguts and Origin, they returned once again to Studio73 from May to June 2014 to record their sophomore album, Derivae, which was released in late October 2014 on Prosthetic. 
Nero di Marte has toured Europe and North America with major acts such as Gorguts, Godflesh, Cynic, Decapitated, Origin, Psycroptic, The Ocean, Intronaut, Ulcerate and Red Fang among others.

Band members

Current members 

Sean Worrell – vocals, guitar
Alessio Cattaneo – guitar
Giorgio Figà Talamanca – bass
Giulio Galati – drums, percussion

Former members 

 Marco Bolognini - drums, percussion
Francesco D'Adamo – guitar
Andrea Burgio – bass

Discography

Albums
 2009 – Symmetry of Delirium (as "Murder Therapy")
 2013 – Nero di Marte
 2014 – Derivae
 2020 - Immoto

EPs
 2008 – The Therapy (as "Murder Therapy")
 2011 – Molochian (as "Murder Therapy")
 2014 – Split MMXV 7" split with Void Of Sleep

Singles and Music Videos
 2013 – Time Dissolves
 2016 – Those Who Leave

Italian musical groups
Post-metal musical groups
Musical groups established in 2012
2012 establishments in Italy